Phetracha (alternative spellings: Bedraja, P'etraja, Petraja, Petratcha; also called Phra Phetracha; , ; 1632– 5 February 1703) was a king of the Ayutthaya kingdom in Thailand, usurping the throne from his predecessor King Narai and originally settled in Phluluang Village. His dynasty, the Ban Phlu Luang dynasty, was the last ruling house of the Ayutthaya Kingdom. 

Originally a member of King Narai's extended family (two of his relatives were among Narai's wives), he was a trusted councilor of Narai, and the Director-General of the Royal Department of Elephants. However, in 1688 he led the Siamese revolution of 1688, had Narai's heirs executed, and by marrying Narai's only daughter took the throne of Ayutthaya kingdom upon Narai's death. He opposed the pro-French policies of Narai, ejecting the French officers and some other French citizens from the kingdom, and launched the Siege of Bangkok, to exile all French troops from Siam. Since then, Siam and France have only contacted a few times. His reign was marred by rebellions, insurrections and political upheavals throughout due to the nature of his ascension to power, especially those claiming ties of loyalty to the previous dynasty, as well as to the late King Narai himself.

Background
Phetracha was born in 1632 at Phuluang village, Suphan Buri. His wet nurse was Chao Mae Dusit who was the mother of Kosa Lek and Kosa Pan, De la Loubère has recorded that he was a cousin of King Narai, and that his mother was also one of King Narai's wet nurses. It was also recorded that his sister would later become one of King Narai's concubines.

He was Right Director-General of the Royal Department of Elephants, and wrote a manual with Narai on the art of elephant craft.  Hence, he was sometimes referred to as "the Elephant Prince".

Although Thai historians recorded that Phetracha was not interested in being King, Jesuit missionaries stated otherwise, that he was an ambitious man. While this matter is ambiguous, it is generally agreed that he was a very influential figure in that period, harboring respect from many officers. It is also said that he strongly believed in Buddhism, thus gaining support from many monks, who feared Ayutthaya kingdom was being converted to Christianity. Moreover, Phetracha seemed to gain King Narai's trust as well, as he was one of King Narai's close aides and confidants. When the royal palace at Lopburi was finished, King Narai would stay there for many months in a year, leaving Phetracha as regent to take care of matters in Ayutthaya.

Phetracha's rivalry with counsellor Constantine Phaulkon is understandable. While Phaulkon's ideology was to open Ayutthaya kingdom to the international community (and benefit from the expansion of foreign trading), Phetracha was a traditionalist who was allegedly disgusted by international influence in Ayutthaya kingdom. King Narai himself favored the opening of his country and created many diplomatic ties with European countries, notably France.

Reign

When Narai was seriously ill with no hope of recovery, on 18 May 1688 Phetracha had a successful coup and arrested Narai himself, his half-brothers Prince Aphaithot and Prince Noi, and his adopted son Phra Pi. Phaulkon was summoned to the palace, there he and the French officers were surrounded and disarmed. Phaulkon was thrown to the palace dungeon and brutally tortured.

After questioning Phra Pi, he discovered Phra Pi had conspired with Phaulkon to assume the throne, and Phra Pi was executed on 20 May.  Further questioning of Phaulkon revealed a plot to raise a rebellion, and he too was executed by Phetracha's adopted son Luang Sorasak on 5 June. Narai, on his deathbed, was unable to do anything, except curse Phetracha and his son. Luang Sorasak then had Prince Aphaithot and Prince Noi executed.

Phetracha soon ordered his troops to attack the French troops led by General Desfarges at the start of Siege of Bangkok. On the death of Narai on 11 July, Phetracha proclaimed himself king, he appointed Luang Sorasak, his son as the Prince Viceroy and Nai Chopkhotchaprasit, the officer under his department and who helped contending the throne as the Prince Deputy Viceroy, and gave regalia as Prince Deputy Viceroy rank with Khun Ongkharaksa and promoted to Chaophraya Surasongkhram, because of the credit to helped contending the throne too.

After withholding the siege for four months and later a negotiated settlement, the French soldiers were allowed to return to France.  Only Hollanders were allowed to trade in the capital before the French and English finally ended their dispute with Siam.

During his reign, "there were troubles for a long time", according to Damrong Rajanubhab.  The governors of Nakhon Si Thammarat and Nakhon Ratchasima rebelled and it took many years for them to be suppressed.

Upon his death on 5 February 1703, Phetracha was succeeded by his eldest son Sorasak, the Prince Vicroy or "Tiger Prince", who took the title of Suriyenthrathibodi.

Issue

Honors

Title

Titles and ranks appointed by King of Siam
Oc Phra Phetracha or Oc-Prá Pipitcharatcha Chancellor of department Elephants Affairs in the reign of King Narai with sakdina 5000.
 Chaophraya Surasi Acting Chancellor of the Ministry of Defence in the reign of King Narai.

Enthronement
Somdet Phra Phetracha King of Siam of the Ban Phlu Luang Dynasty.

Namesakes
 Phetracha Road. Lopburi province.
 Phra Phetracha auditorium. Thepsatri Rajabhat University Lopburi province.

In popular culture
King Phetracha's corporeal presence was mentioned in:

Thai literature

 Chronicle of Phan Chanthanumat records the history of Phetracha's reign

International literature
Louis XIV et le Siam the French-Siamese historical fiction composed by Dirk Van der Cruysse. Phetracha was mentioned of troublemaker in the French embassy parade.
Pour la plus grande gloire de Dieu composed by Morgan Sportès. Phetracha was crowned king of Siam in the reign of King Narai.
Phaulkon the adventurer (1862) composed by William Dalton. The fiction mentioned Phetracha who was crowned king of Siam and executed Constantine Phaulkon.
Le Ministre des moussons the French-Siamese historical fiction composed by Claire Keefe-Fox mentioned Phetracha during the ousting of French forces in 1688.

Film and Television
Love Destiny (TV series) Phra Phetracha was King Narai's regent cast by Sarut Vijittranon.
OM! Crush on me (2021) Thai historical movie mentioned Phra Phetracha who was general director of department of Elephants Affairs.
Sri Ayodhaya 2 King Phetracha cast by M.R. Mongkolchai Yugala.

Legend

See also
 Ayutthaya Kingdom

References

1632 births
1703 deaths
Ban Phlu Luang dynasty
Kings of Ayutthaya
Leaders who took power by coup
17th-century monarchs in Asia
18th-century monarchs in Asia
17th-century Thai people
18th-century Thai people
18th-century Thai monarchs